Thomas Sbokos (born 10 April 1972 in Heraklion) is a Greek sprinter who specialized in the 200 metres.

He won the bronze medal at the 1995 Summer Universiade and finished fourth at the 1996 European Indoor Championships. He also competed at the 1996 Olympic Games and the World Championships in 1995 and 1997 without reaching the final.

His personal best time was 20.28 seconds, achieved in July 1995 in Patras. This ranks him third among Greek 200 metres sprinters, behind Konstantinos Kenteris and Anastassios Gousis.

Honours

References
 
Thomas Smbokos. Sports Reference. Retrieved on 2015-01-08.

1972 births
Living people
Greek male sprinters
Athletes (track and field) at the 1996 Summer Olympics
Olympic athletes of Greece
Athletes from Heraklion
World Athletics Championships athletes for Greece
Universiade medalists in athletics (track and field)
Universiade bronze medalists for Greece
Medalists at the 1995 Summer Universiade
20th-century Greek people